Pterochromis congicus is a species of cichlid native to the Congo River Basin in Central Africa. This genus and Pelmatolapia are the only in the tribe Pelmatolapiini, but formerly they were included in Tilapiini.

References

Tilapiini
Taxa named by George Albert Boulenger
Fish described in 1897